OTMA was an acronym sometimes used by the four daughters of Emperor Nicholas II of Russia and his consort, Alexandra Feodorovna, as a group nickname for themselves, built from the first letter of each girl's name in the order of their births:

 Ольга – Olga Nikolaevna Romanova (15 November 1895 – 17 July 1918) was the eldest daughter.
 Татьяна – Tatiana Nikolaevna Romanova (10 June 1897 – 17 July 1918) was the second daughter. 
 Мария – Maria Nikolaevna Romanova (26 June 1899 – 17 July 1918) was the third daughter.
 Анастасия – Anastasia Nikolaevna Romanova (18 June 1901 – 17 July 1918) was the youngest daughter. 

Note that the Roman and Cyrillic forms of all four of the initial letters are identical in printed form.

In childhood the grand duchesses came up with ОТМА as a sign of sibling closeness and affection for one another, writing it in their diaries. Whilst the family was in captivity after the Russian Revolution of 1917 they were allowed to send few letters, and so the sisters often signed this nickname on cards they had written together for loved ones and friends. 

The four girls used this acronym to further blend themselves in together-to become even more of a unit — a pack — than they already were. In addition, they were grouped into pairs: the Big Pair, composed of Grand Duchesses Olga and Tatiana and the Little Pair, composed of Grand Duchesses Maria and Anastasia. They were often dressed alike, sometimes in their individual pairs, sometimes in the whole group. It was noted that the Grand Duchesses were usually in some variation of their sisters' dress.

References

Russian grand duchesses
Sibling quartets